Kephala is a hill landform in northern Crete, Greece.  This location was chosen by ancient settlers for the site of the Palace of Knossos; the footprint of the Neolithic settlement at Kephala Hill was actually larger than the Bronze Age Palace of Knossos.

See also
Minoan civilization

References

Neolithic settlements in Crete
Hills of Greece
Landforms of Crete
Landforms of Heraklion (regional unit)
Knossos